Hossein-Ali Amiri is an Iranian jurist and conservative politician who currently serves as the Vice President of Iran for Parliamentary Affairs in the cabinet of Hassan Rouhani.

Amiri formerly held office as the deputy of Ministry of Interior under Abdolreza Rahmani Fazli, a member of the Guardian Council and a deputy of Judiciary branch under Mahmoud Hashemi Shahroudi.

References 

People from Sonqor
1967 births
Living people
Iranian jurists
Vice Presidents of Iran for Parliamentary Affairs
Islamic Azad University alumni
Members of the Guardian Council